Ángel Gallardo (19 November 1867, in Buenos Aires – 13 May 1934, in Buenos Aires) was an Argentine civil engineer, natural scientist and politician. He served variously as the president of the National Council of Education, the Minister of Foreign Affairs and the Rector of the University of Buenos Aires. He was recognised for his scientific work both in Argentina and abroad.

Gallardo's scientific work dealt with problems of heredity and cell division.

Early life
He graduated from the Colegio Nacional de Buenos Aires in 1887 and received his degree in civil engineering from Facultad de Ciencias Exactas y Naturales (UBA) of the University of Buenos Aires in 1894. However, in addition to civil engineering, beginning in 1892 he studied natural history (biology) under Carlos Berg at the Bernardino Rivadavia Natural Sciences Museum.

A street in Buenos Aires is named after him.

In 1916, botanist Cristóbal Mariá Hicken (1875-1933), named a species of plant from Argentina, after him, Gallardoa.

References

Other sources
  Hathi Trust copy, search only
 
 

1867 births
1934 deaths
Academic staff of the University of Buenos Aires
University of Buenos Aires alumni
Argentine naturalists
Argentine zoologists
Argentine entomologists
Foreign ministers of Argentina
Rectors of the University of Buenos Aires